State Route 35 (SR 35), generally known as Skyline Boulevard for most of its length, is a mostly two-lane state highway in the U.S. state of California. It runs along the ridge of the Santa Cruz Mountains from the high point of State Route 17 near Lexington Reservoir in Santa Clara County to State Route 1 just south of Daly City in San Mateo County, where it crosses SR 1 and loops around Lake Merced to become Sloat Boulevard in San Francisco. SR 35 then continues along Sloat Boulevard until it reaches its terminus when it meets SR 1 again at 19th Avenue.

Because of its high elevation and location, it is one of the few places on the southern portion of the San Francisco Peninsula from which the San Francisco Bay and the Pacific Ocean are both visible at the same time. It also provides scenic views of the Silicon Valley metropolitan area. 

It was originally designated State Route 5 (SR 5), but this had to be changed with the creation of Interstate 5 (I-5) in 1964 to avoid confusion between the two roads.

Route description

The highway begins at the junction of Summit Road and State Route 17, at Patchen Pass. While SR 17 traverses the pass outright, SR 35 primarily is on the ridgeline. The portion of SR 35 from SR 17 to Bear Creek Road is called Summit Road. The highway then merges with Bear Creek Road for a few miles before becoming Skyline Boulevard. It bears the name Skyline Boulevard for a majority of its route along the ridge of the Santa Cruz Mountains to the west of Silicon Valley, passing by cities such as San Jose, Saratoga, and Palo Alto. The southern portion of the road, starting at Highway 17 and ending at Black Road, is mostly a narrow and winding country road without a double-yellow line. However, the road has been upgraded to 2 lanes beginning at Black Road, and remains in this configuration until it merges with Interstate 280 north of California State Route 92. The road reaches its highest elevation near Sanborn Skyline County Park at about 3,000 ft (914 m). The road passes through the small community of Sky Londa where it intersects State Route 84. The ridge that the road follows forms the border between Santa Cruz and Santa Clara counties. However, the boundary is so irregular that the road weaves in and out of the two counties. 

The ridgetop portion of the route ends at the junction with State Route 92, because this northern area of the Santa Cruz Mountains is a protected watershed owned by the San Francisco Water Department. Highway 35 is co-routed with SR 92 for 2 miles (3 km) east, descending towards Crystal Springs Reservoir, which it crosses on a causeway, and then joins Interstate 280 northbound for 6 miles (10 km). However, on the southbound side, Route 35 exists as a separate road to the west of the freeway between Bunker Hill Dr. and Route 92, as there is no connector road between 280 South and 92 West. 

Route 35 departs from 280 at the southern end of San Bruno, running to the west of the freeway, regaining the ridgetop separating South San Francisco and Daly City from Pacifica.

It crosses State Route 1 in Daly City and in San Francisco, Skyline Boulevard ends and the highway briefly continues along Sloat Boulevard until it reaches its terminus when it intersects Highway 1 again at 19th Avenue.

SR 35 is part of the California Freeway and Expressway System, but is not part of the National Highway System, a network of highways that are considered essential to the country's economy, defense, and mobility by the Federal Highway Administration. SR 35 is eligible for the State Scenic Highway System; however, only the portion from the Santa Cruz–Santa Clara County line to the SR 92 junction is officially designated as a scenic highway by the California Department of Transportation, meaning that it is a substantial section of highway passing through a "memorable landscape" with no "visual intrusions", where the potential designation has gained popular favor with the community.

Recreational use
Because of its scenic views and winding roadway, Skyline Boulevard and surrounding roads see substantial recreational motoring and bicycling use. Many sports cars and motorcycles can be found congregating near the intersections with State Route 9 and State Route 84, particularly on weekends. Mountain bikers are also commonly found at the many trailheads along the road.

Several public open spaces border on Skyline Boulevard, including Sanborn County Park, Windy Hill, and the Purisima Open Space; both the latter are parts of the Midpeninsula Regional Open Space District. Numerous hiking trails originate from parking lots off Skyline in these open spaces.  

Whenever there is snow on the road's higher elevations, many people take their families up to see and play in the snow, and therefore, many of the parking lots at regional parks are packed with cars.

Other landmarks
For most of the route, State Route 35 offers vistas of both San Francisco Bay and the Pacific Ocean. The route passes through or by several Midpeninsula Regional Open Space District preserves and other parks, from south to north:
Bear Creek Redwoods Open Space Preserve
Sanborn-Skyline County Park (Santa Cruz county)
Castle Rock State Park
Saratoga Gap Open Space Preserve
Long Ridge Open Space Preserve
Skyline Ridge Open Space Preserve
Monte Bello Open Space Preserve
Coal Creek Open Space Preserve
Russian Ridge Open Space Preserve
Windy Hill Open Space Preserve
La Honda Creek Open Space Preserve
Wunderlich County Park (San Mateo county)
El Corte de Madera Creek Open Space Preserve
Huddart County Park (San Mateo county)
Purisima Creek Redwoods Open Space Preserve
Miramontes Ridge Open Space Preserve

A number of streams originate near Skyline Boulevard, flowing to both Pacific Ocean and the Bay. Among the bayside streams are San Francisquito Creek, Redwood Creek, and San Bruno Creek.

History

The original road called State Route 35 was located in southern California and ran north to south from State Route 22 to U.S. 99, first along Los Alamitos Blvd. going north which turns into Norwalk Blvd. The highway continued west on Centralia Road and then north along Pioneer Blvd. until hitting San Antonio drive at Rosecrans Ave. San Antonio Dr. would turn back into Norwalk Blvd. and continue with that street name until turning into Old Mill Road at Beverly Blvd. Route 35 would wind through Rose Hills and Avocado Heights as Workman Mill Rd. and would then turn into Puente Ave. at Valley Blvd. where it would continue to its end at U.S. 99 at the border of Baldwin Park and West Covina.

The current State Route 35, Skyline Boulevard, was originally designated State Route 5. The number was changed in the 1964 renumbering in California. On February 10, 2017 a huge washout washed away a 220-foot stretch of SR 35 about five miles south of the junction with State Route 9. Repairs were completed and the section of road re-opened January 9, 2018.

Major intersections

See also

References

External links

AARoads - State Route 35
Caltrans: Route 35 highway conditions
California Highways: SR 35
Skyline Motorcycle Map at SundayMorningRides.com

035
035
State Route 035
State Route 035
State Route 035
State Route 035
Santa Cruz Mountains
35